The Central Economic Mathematical Institute of the Russian Academy of Sciences is an economic research institute located in Moscow. It focuses on economic theory, mathematical economics and econometrics. The CEMI was established in 1963 as an institute of the Academy of Sciences of the USSR, superseding the Laboratory of Economics and Mathematical Methods which had been founded by Vasily Sergeevich Nemchinov in 1958. In 1964 a branch of the institute was created in Tallinn, and in 1966 a Leningrad branch was established.

"When the Institute was founded in 1963, is main goal was an "introduction on the mathematical methods and computers in the practice of planning, creation of the theory of the optimal control of the national economy". In fact, the initial founding vision of the Institute was more ambitious. Of six founding research objectives mentioned by Fedorenko in his 1964, three of them directly bore on the "development of a unified system of economic information", the "design and creation of a unified state network of computer centers", and "Derivation of specialized planning and management systems based on mathematical methods and computer technology." Although its failure has since obscured this history, the Institute was initially meant to be the leading organization charged with creating a nationwide economic information network.

Nowadays CEMI's focus has been on the transition period from communism to capitalism in Russia, and on microeconomic models and models of enterprises' behaviour. The so-called System of Optimal Functioning of the Economy (SOFE), with its mathematical planning approach based on methods developed by Leonid Kantorovich and its IT approach, was intensively discussed during Soviet times. It was objected to by some Marxist economists as representatives of the Political Economy, who were afraid that the mathematical formula approach was too close to Western economics, and might lead to Soviet economics converting to Western economics, which also rely on mathematical formulas.  CEMI's first director was N.P. Fedorenko. In 1985 he was succeeded by the Russian academic V.L. Makarov, who still directs the institute.

Academic N.P. Fedorenko and other Russian scientists have issued many books on SOFE; most of them are in Russian.

CEMI headquarters features an alto-relievo mosaic composition of a Möbius strip on its facade, created by architect Leonid Pavlov and painter/monumentalists V. Vasiltsov and E. Zharenova in 1976.

References

External links
Official Homepage

1963 establishments in the Soviet Union
Think tanks established in 1963
Think tanks based in Russia
Political and economic think tanks based in Europe
Institutes of the Russian Academy of Sciences
Economy of the Soviet Union
Research institutes in the Soviet Union
Buildings and structures built in the Soviet Union
Economic research institutes
Research institutes established in 1963